Omphalodes cappadocica, the Cappadocian navelwort, is a species of flowering plant in the family Boraginaceae, native to woodland habitats in Turkey.

This plant is valued in cultivation as groundcover for moist, shady situations, such as woodland plantings. The species  and the cultivar 'Cherry Ingram' are recipients of the Royal Horticultural Society's Award of Garden Merit.

Etymology
Omphalodes is derived from Greek and means 'navel-like'; this is a reference to the shape of the fruit of navel wort.

Cappadocica means 'from Cappadocia, Asia Minor (Turkey).

References

External links

cappadocica